Songs from the Lion's Cage is the debut album of British Progressive rock group Arena, released on 25 July 1995. This is the only Arena album to feature vocalist John Carson and bassist Cliff Orsi.

Track listing 

All songs by Clive Nolan & Mick Pointer

 "Out of the Wilderness" - 8:02
 "Crying for Help I" - 1:22
 "Valley of the Kings" - 10:10
 "Crying for Help II" - 3:08
 "Jericho" - 6:50
 "Crying for Help III" - 4:24
 "Midas Vision" - 4:36
 "Crying for Help IV" - 5:05
 "Solomon" - 14:37

From Irond Ltd label edition - 2004 

 "Chosen" - Live - 6:31
 "Elea" - Live - 2:36
 "Friday's Dream" - Live - 4:33

Personnel 

Clive Nolan - Keyboards
Mick Pointer - Drums
John Carson - Vocals
Keith More - Guitars
Cliff Orsi - Bass
Steve Rothery - Guest Guitar Solo on "Crying For Help IV"

References

2 https://www.discogs.com/fr/Arena-Songs-From-The-Lions-Cage/release/7415389

1995 debut albums
Arena (band) albums